Panicum (panicgrass) is a large genus of about 450 species of grasses native throughout the tropical regions of the world, with a few species extending into the northern temperate zone.

The fruits are developed from a two-flowered spikelet. Only the upper floret of each spikelet is fertile; the lower floret is sterile or staminate. Both glumes are present and well developed.

Australia has 29 native and 9 introduced species of Panicum.

Well-known Panicum species include Panicum miliaceum (proso millet) and Panicum virgatum (switchgrass).

Selected species

Formerly classified in this genus, according to The Plant List:

Gallery

References

External links 
  Interactive Key to Panicum of North America

 
Poaceae genera
Taxa named by Carl Linnaeus